3rd Rock from the Sun is an American television sitcom created by Bonnie and Terry Turner, which originally aired from January 9, 1996, to May 22, 2001, on NBC. The show is about four extraterrestrials who are on an expedition to Earth, the third planet from the Sun, which they consider to be a very insignificant planet. The extraterrestrials pose as a human family to observe the behavior of human beings.

The show premiered three years after the film Coneheads, which was also written by the couple and featured a similar premise of aliens arriving on Earth and assimilating into American society. Coneheads also starred Jane Curtin as one of the titular alien Coneheads and featured a supporting cast including Jan Hooks, Phil Hartman, Julia Sweeney and Laraine Newman, all of whom appeared as guest stars on 3rd Rock from the Sun.

Overview 
The premise of the show revolves around an extraterrestrial research expedition hailing from a planet in a barred spiral galaxy on the Cepheus-Draco border attempting to live as a normal human family in the fictional city of Rutherford, Ohio, said to be  outside of Cleveland where they live in an attic apartment. The show's humor is principally derived from the aliens' attempts to study human society and understand the human condition, while living as humans on Earth, reflecting on human life from the perspective of aliens. Most of the episodes are named after the protagonist, Dick. In later episodes, they have become more accustomed to Earth and are often more interested in their human lives than in their mission.

The show also takes humor from its mirroring of all human anthropological expeditions and their assumptions of superiority to the "natives", as well as their inability to distinguish themselves from the natives. Dr. Mary Albright (Jane Curtin) is a professor of anthropology at fictional Pendelton State University, and many of the issues with which the four aliens struggle appear in her conversation and work. Furthermore, these four alien researchers end up looking approximately like joyriders as they get drawn increasingly further into human life.

Dick Solomon (John Lithgow), the High Commander and leader of the expedition, is the family provider and a physics professor at Pendelton (with Lithgow's eldest son Ian playing Leon, one of his less-successful students). Information officer and oldest member of the crew Tommy (Joseph Gordon-Levitt) has been given the body of a teenager and is forced to enroll in high school (later college), leaving security officer Sally (Kristen Johnston) and "the one with the transmitter in his head", Harry (French Stewart), to spend their lives as 20-somethings hanging out at home and bouncing through short-term jobs. The show also involves their relationships with humans, mostly their love interests.

The family often communicates through Harry with their off-world (and usually unseen) boss, the Big Giant Head, who when he finally visits Earth, is played by William Shatner. Harry unexpectedly (and often in inconvenient circumstances) stands up, his arms stiff (acting as the antenna), and proclaims: "Incoming message from the Big Giant Head!"

Cast

Main characters 

 John Lithgow as Dick Solomon
 Kristen Johnston as Sally Solomon
 French Stewart as Harry Solomon
 Joseph Gordon-Levitt as Tommy Solomon
 Jane Curtin as Mary Albright
 Simbi Khali as Nina Campbell (seasons 3–6, recurring previously)
 Elmarie Wendel as Mamie Dubcek (seasons 3–6, recurring previously)
 Wayne Knight as Officer Don Orville (seasons 3–6, recurring previously)

Recurring characters 
 David DeLuise as Bug Pollone, one of Dick's students
 Ian Lithgow as Leon, one of Dick's students
 Danielle Nicolet as Caryn, one of Dick's students
 Chris Hogan as Aubrey Pitman, one of Dick's students
 Ileen Getz as Dr. Judith Draper, professor at Pendelton and colleague of Mary
 Shay Astar as August Leffler, Tommy's first girlfriend (seasons 1–3, sparsely appears in seasons 3 and 4)
 Larisa Oleynik as Alissa Strudwick, Tommy's second girlfriend (seasons 4–6)
 Ron West as Dr. Vincent Strudwick, Alissa's father and rival to Dick (seasons 2–6)
 William Shatner as The Big Giant Head, the aliens' boss
 Jan Hooks as Vicki Dubcek, daughter of Ms. Dubcek, Harry's on-and-off girlfriend and later the wife of the Big Giant Head and the mother of his child
 John Cleese as Dr. Liam Neesam, a professor who briefly has a relationship with Mary, and is later revealed to be an evil alien (seasons 3 and 6)
 Chyna as Janice, a muscular female police officer who is briefly Harry's girlfriend
 Michael Milhoan as Coach Strickland, a high school physical education teacher at Tommy's high school

Guest stars

Production

Theme music 
The show's opening theme music, composed by Ben Vaughn, was originally a 1950s-style rock-and-roll instrumental piece for the first four seasons; the theme was extended slightly in season three, when Simbi Khali, Elmarie Wendel, and Wayne Knight were officially made series regulars and added to the opening credits. During season one, James Earl Jones provided a voice introduction describing the crew. For Christmas episodes, jingle bells were added to the theme. The only major change to the theme was in season five, when the original Ben Vaughn version was replaced by a big band cover of the theme, performed by the group Big Bad Voodoo Daddy, and was only used during that season. For the sixth and final season, the original theme returned and a modern jazz underline version of the theme was used for two episodes.

Title sequence 
The opening title sequence, which was produced by the London graphic design firm SVC Television, opens with computerized shots of planets and celestial bodies, some either with the planets dancing or moving in warp speed. It opens and closes with a shot of Earth (which at the open is where the show's title logo appears, after a sunburst appears on the side of Earth). For the sixth and final season only, the typeface of the cast and creators' names was altered.

Episodes 

Of the series' 139 episodes, 108 contained "Dick" in the title (referencing John Lithgow's character). While some of the episode titles with "Dick" in them are innocent (i.e., "Tom, Dick and Mary", "Dick Is From Mars, Sally Is From Venus"), others are more risqué and often are double entendres (i.e., "Sensitive Dick", "A Dick Replacement", "Frozen Dick", "Shall We Dick"), because the word "Dick" is both a short form of Richard and a slang term for penis. One episode from season six used an abbreviation for a title, "B.D.O.C.", since the full title ("Big Dick on Campus") was deemed too risqué.

During the show's sixth and final season, John Lithgow commented to several media outlets that 3rd Rock had been moved to more than 15 different time slots in six years, causing its ratings to decrease substantially.

Broadcast

Syndication 
In the United States, the series is distributed for syndication by Carsey-Werner Distribution, and entered broadcast syndication in September 1999, where it continued until the fall of 2004, when the show moved into limited-run barter syndication, where it remained until 2016; The Program Exchange handled distribution for Carsey-Werner. ABC Family aired reruns between 2002 and 2006. Reruns of the series aired on TV Land from 2008 through 2010. In the fall of 2010, ReelzChannel began airing the series. The series made its debut on digital broadcast network Laff on July 16, 2018, until May 16, 2021, when it moved to IFC as well on Cozi TV beginning July 18.

In Italy, this series aired on Italia 1 under the name Una famiglia del terzo tipo (A family of the third kind) in 1999.

This series rerun is now also aired on Malaysia's national broadcast TV channel RTM's TV2 in the 12:30 am time slot on Tuesday and Wednesday nights.

In the United Kingdom, the series originally aired on BBC Two from 1996 to 2002, and ITV2 later reran the entire series from 2005 to 2006. Cable network Virgin Media currently has 40 episodes from seasons one and two available on demand from the Comedy Central menu option. The series began airing from the beginning on Channel 4 from May 12, 2014, but moved to 5Star in January 2019 but was dropped in July 2020.
Beginning on March 29, 2021, the series began airing on Comedy Central. On July 4, 2022, the show returned to Channel 4.

In the fall of 2011, Canada's TVTropolis cable channel began airing the show, and featured a long weekend marathon run of episodes.

Streaming 
Netflix made the complete series available online in March 2011. It was removed several months later in the fall of 2011, but returned on March 15, 2015, and was removed again exactly two years later. The series also was available to stream on Hulu.

As of 2021, the series is currently available to stream on Amazon Prime Video, FilmRise, Hoopla, Tubi, Pluto TV, Crackle, Vudu, IMDb TV and Peacock.

In the UK, the first two seasons were available to download through the UK iTunes store but are no longer offered. As of 2022, the full series is available on Sky Go and All4.

Home media
Region 1
Anchor Bay Entertainment released all six seasons of 3rd Rock from the Sun on DVD for the first time in 2005–2006. Seasons 1 & 2 contain the edited, syndicated versions of the episodes instead of the original broadcast versions. As of 2010, these releases have been discontinued and are out of print. On these DVDs, the bloopers segments (on the last disc of each season) are in 16:9 format, indicating the series may have been filmed in 16:9 format.

On May 4, 2011, Mill Creek Entertainment announced they had acquired the rights to re-release the series on DVD in Region 1. They have subsequently re-released seasons 1–4. These releases contain the unedited, original broadcast versions of the episodes.
Seasons 5 and 6 were re-released on January 8, 2013.

On May 14, 2013, Mill Creek released 3rd Rock from the Sun – The Complete Series on DVD in Region 1.

Region 2
Network DVD released all six seasons on DVD in the UK. While seasons 1–4 feature unedited versions of the episodes, seasons five and six feature syndicated, edited episodes. Network re-released the series in 2008 in an individual set and a complete collection.

 The Complete Season One (released May 17, 2004)  
 The Complete Season Two (released June 21, 2004) 
 The Complete Season Three (released August 30, 2004) 
 The Complete Season Four (released October 25, 2004) 
 The Complete Season Five (released January 24, 2005) 
 The Complete Season Six (released January 24, 2005) 
 The Complete Series (released October 25, 2004)
 Series One (re-released November 3, 2008) 
 Series Two (re-released November 3, 2008)  
 Series Three (re-released November 3, 2008) 
 Series Four (re-released November 3, 2008) 
 Series Five (re-released November 3, 2008)  
 Series Six (re-released November 3, 2008) 
 The Complete Series (re-released November 3, 2008)

Region 4
Magna Home Entertainment released all six seasons on DVD in Australia between 2005 and 2007.  These releases have been discontinued and are now out of print.

 Season 1 and Season 2 (released November 11, 2005)
 Season 3 (released February 7, 2006)
 Season 4 (July 6, 2006)
 Season 5 and Season 6 (released February 16, 2007)

On November 15, 2010, Beyond Home Entertainment re-released all six seasons on DVD in Region 4. The complete collection was also released three days later, on November 18.

Reception

Nielsen rankings

Awards and nominations 

In 1997, 3rd Rock won the most Primetime Emmy Awards (five from eight nominations) for a television series:

 1996, 1997, 1998, 1999, 2000, 2001 — Outstanding Lead Actor — Comedy Series — John Lithgow
 1997, 1998, 1999 — Outstanding Supporting Actress — Comedy Series — Kristen Johnston
 1996, 1997 — Outstanding Hairstyling for a Series — Pixie Schwartz
 1996 — Outstanding Directing for a Comedy Series — James Burrows
 1998 — Outstanding Directing for a Comedy Series — Terry Hughes
 1997 — Outstanding Special Visual Effects — Glen Bennett, Visual Effects Artists; Patrick Shearn, Visual Effects Supervisor; Chris Staves, Visual Effects Artists
 1997, 1999, 2000 — Outstanding Sound Mixing — Comedy Series
 1998 — Outstanding Sound Mixing — Comedy Series — "A Nightmare on Dick Street"
 1997, 1998 — Outstanding Costume Design — Series — Melina Root
 1997, 1998 — Outstanding Comedy Series
 1997 — Outstanding Choreography — Marguerite Derricks
 1998 — Outstanding Guest Actress in a Comedy Series — Jan Hooks as Vicki Dubcek
 1998 — Outstanding Guest Actor in a Comedy Series — John Cleese as Dr. Neesam
 1999, 2000 — Outstanding Multicamera Picture Editing for a Series
 1999 — Outstanding Guest Actress in a Comedy Series — Kathy Bates as Charlotte Everly and Laurie Metcalf as Jennifer
 1999 — Outstanding Guest Actor in a Comedy Series — William Shatner as the Big Giant Head
 2000 — Outstanding Cinematography for a Multicamera Series

John Lithgow received an Emmy Award nomination for Outstanding Lead Actor in a Comedy Series for each year the show was broadcast, winning the Emmy in 1996, 1997, and 1999. Accepting the 1999 award, he said, "Many wonderful things have happened to me in my life, but the two best are 3rd Rock and my dear family."

Golden Globe Awards
 1997 — Best Actor in a Television Comedy or Musical — John Lithgow
Screen Actors Guild Awards
 1996, 1997 — Best Male Actor — Comedy Series — John Lithgow

Other media 
A tie-in book, 3rd Rock from the Sun: The Official Report On Earth, was released in 1997. It is essentially a report of the Solomons' findings during their stay on Earth. Primarily a source of humor, the book includes such features as "What to do if you encounter Jell-O", a fan biography of Katie Couric written by Harry, and Sally's version of a Cosmo quiz. Portions of the book are included in the booklets inside each season set of the series.

Despite the report's being set within the fictional world of 3rd Rock, a foreword written by John Lithgow himself is included in which he explains how he was abducted by the 3rd Rock producers and forced to work on their production. A Post-it note is attached to the foreword, apparently written by Dick Solomon, stating  he does not know why the foreword is there, but that Lithgow is an Earth actor who appeared in "some helicopter movie".

See also
ALF
Coneheads
Invader Zim
Mork & Mindy
My Favorite Martian
My Parents Are Aliens
The Neighbors
Marvin Marvin
Ready Jet Go!
Solar Opposites

References

External links

3rd Rock from the Sun @ Carsey Werner
Carsey Werner - 3rd Rock from the Sun 

 
1996 American television series debuts
1990s American college television series
1990s American comic science fiction television series
1990s American sitcoms
2000s American college television series
2000s American comic science fiction television series
2000s American sitcoms
2001 American television series endings
Best Musical or Comedy Series Golden Globe winners
English-language television shows
NBC original programming
Primetime Emmy Award-winning television series
Super Bowl lead-out shows
Television series about alien visitations
Television series about extraterrestrial life
Television series by Carsey-Werner Productions
Television shows set in Ohio
Television series about families
Television series created by Bonnie and Terry Turner
Television series about educators
Works about higher education